Fatou Bom Bensouda (born 31 January 1961) is a Gambian lawyer and former Prosecutor of the International Criminal Court (ICC), who has served as the Gambian High Commissioner to the United Kingdom since 3 August 2022. 

She served as Prosecutor from June 2012 to June 2021, after having served as a Deputy Prosecutor in charge of the Prosecutions Division of the ICC from 2004 to 2012. Before that she was Minister of Justice and Attorney General of The Gambia from 1998 to 2000. She has also held positions as a legal adviser and a trial attorney at the International Criminal Tribunal for Rwanda (ICTR).

On 2September 2020, Bensouda was named a "specially designated national" by the United States government under the Trump administration, forbidding all U.S. persons and companies from doing business with her. The Biden administration reversed course on 2April 2021 when President Joe Biden revoked EO 13928, removing Bensouda from the SDN list; US Secretary of State Antony Blinken released a statement calling the previous sanctions "inappropriate and ineffective", but still restated that Washington will continue strongly opposing any ICC's actions relating to the Afghanistan and Palestinian situations.

Early life and education

Born on 31 January 1961 in Banjul (then Bathurst), Gambia, into a polygamous Muslim family, she is the daughter of Omar Gaye Nyang, who was a government driver and the country's most prominent wrestling promoter. Her father was a major landowner who also owned several wrestling arenas in the country. Fatou Bensouda is the niece of the Gambian historian and author Alieu Ebrima Cham Joof. Her father is related to the Joof family through his maternal grandmother Ndombuur Joof (Alieu Ebrima Cham Joof's great-aunt). Ndombuur is also the paternal grandmother of the renowned singer Marie Samuel Njie.

She attended primary and secondary school in the Gambia before leaving in 1982 for Nigeria, where she graduated from the University of Ife with a Bachelor of Laws (Hons) degree in 1986. The following year, she obtained her professional qualification as a barrister-at-law from the Nigeria Law School. She later became the Gambia's first expert in international maritime law after earning a master's of laws from the International Maritime Law Institute in Malta.

Career

Roles under Presidents Sir Dawda Jawara and Yahya Jammeh

Fatou Bensouda was appointed as state counsel in 1987 and deputy director of public prosecutions in February 1994 for Sir Dawda Jawara's government.

She played a central role in the early years of Gambian President Yahya Jammeh's regime, being chosen as his Solicitor General and legal adviser in 1996, after he took power in the 1994 Gambian coup d'état. She became Minister of Justice and Attorney General in August 1998, but was dismissed from both posts in March 2000.

She has been criticised in The Gambia for her role in the dictatorship of Yahya Jammeh. and has denied the responsibility for her prosecutions and the cases of torture under the regime she was a part of.

Yahya Jammeh's former regime was accused by human rights groups of various abuses. He is notably accused of harassing the opposition and the press, after the coup in 1994.

International criminal prosecutor and legal adviser

Bensouda's international career as a non-government civil servant began at the International Criminal Tribunal for Rwanda, where she worked as a legal adviser and a trial attorney before rising to the position of senior legal adviser and head of the Legal Advisory Unit (May 2002 to August 2004). On 8 August 2004, she was elected as Deputy Prosecutor (Prosecutions) with an overwhelming majority of votes by the Assembly of State Parties of the International Criminal Court. On 1 November 2004, she was sworn into Office as Deputy Prosecutor (Prosecutions).

On 1 December 2011, the Assembly of States Parties of the ICC announced that an informal agreement had been reached to make Bensouda the consensus choice to succeed Luis Moreno-Ocampo as Prosecutor of the ICC. She was formally elected by consensus on 12 December 2011. Her term as prosecutor began on 15 June 2012.

According to an Associated Press report on 6 November 2015, Bensouda was advised that war crimes may have been committed on the ship Mavi Marmara in 2010, when eight Turks and one Turkish-American were killed and several other activists were wounded by Israeli commandos, but she ruled that the case was not serious enough to merit an investigation on behalf of the ICC.

In November 2017, Bensouda advised the ICC to consider seeking charges for human rights abuses committed during the War in Afghanistan such as alleged rapes and torture by the United States Armed Forces and the Central Intelligence Agency, crime against humanity committed by the Taliban, and war crimes committed by the Afghan National Security Forces. John Bolton, National Security Advisor of the United States, claimed that the International Criminal Court had no jurisdiction over the United States, which has not ratified the Rome Statute that created the ICC. However, Afghanistan did ratify the Rome Statute, and thus crimes committed on its territory by anyone, even if he or she is a citizen of a country that did not accept the ICC's legitimacy, is subject to its jurisdiction.

Less than a month before handing over her post to her successor, Karim Khan, she declared in a podcast: "Something I have experienced is pressure, attacks and politicization [but] what we do in this office is critically important," adding, "History will judge us."

Other activities

Professional associations and boards 
Bensouda is a member of the International Gender Champions (IGC). She was previously a member of International Advisory Council, International Board of Maritime Healthcare. She is a member of both The Gambia Bar Association and the Nigeria Bar Association. She is also a member of the International Association of Prosecutors.

Bensouda also served on the Governing Council of the Gambia Committee on Harmful Traditional Practices (GAMCOTRAP) which is a leading women's rights organization fighting against harmful traditional practices and Member of The  Advisory Board of  The  African Centre For Democracy and Human Rights Studies from 1998 to 2000. Bensouda is a former 1st Vice President of The Gambia National Olympics Committee (GNOC). From 1992-1995, she served as a board member of Gambia High School Board of Governors and a member of the Executive Committee of the Marina International School, The Gambia from 1994.

Lectures 
Bensouda has given several lectures on the ICC, and its challenges and successes, on several platforms, notably ''The Office of the Prosecutor of the International Criminal Court: Successes, Challenges and the Promise of International Criminal Justice'' in the Lecture Series of the United Nations Audiovisual Library of International Law.

Awards and honours

Bensouda has been the recipient of various awards, most notably, the distinguished ICJ International Jurists Award in 2009, which was presented by the then President of India Pratibha Patil. Bensouda was presented the award for her contributions to criminal law both at the national and international level.

Bensouda has also been awarded the 2011 World Peace Through Law Award presented by the Whitney R. Harris World Law Institute at Washington University in St. Louis, which recognized her work in considerably advancing the rule of law and thereby contributing to world peace.

In 2012, Time magazine listed Bensouda among the 100 most influential people in the world in its annual Time 100 issue, noting her role as a "leading voice pressing governments to support the quest for justice".

The African magazine Jeune Afrique named Bensouda as the 4th most influential person in Africa in the Civil Society category  and one of the 100 most Influential African Personalities.

In December 2014, the Togolese magazine Africa Top Success named her "African of the Year", ahead of Isabel dos Santos, Angélique Kidjo, Lupita Nyong'o, Daphne Mashile-Nkosi and Koki Mutungi.

In 2015, she was listed as one of BBC's 100 Women.

The same year, she was awarded a doctorate honoris causa from Keele University (UK).

Controversies

In October 2017, Bensouda and two members of her staff were accused by Der Spiegel of staying in touch with her predecessor, questioning the Prosecutor's own integrity when Bensouda sent confidential information to Ocampo. It was also suggested that Bensouda sought the advice of her predecessor on several occasions and perhaps allowed herself to be influenced by him, specifically in Kenya and Yazidi cases.

The US State Department revoked Bensouda's visa in early April 2019. The Guardian reported that the visa withdrawal seemed to be the fulfillment of a threat from Secretary of State Mike Pompeo to prevent ICC personnel from investigating whether U.S. servicemen or U.S. officials engaged in war crimes in Afghanistan, Poland, Romania and Lithuania. The visa revocation triggered criticism from United Nations officials.

In June 2020, U.S. President Donald Trump issued an executive order that allowed the United States to block assets of ICC employees, and prevent them and their immediate families from entering the country. In September 2020, US Secretary of State Mike Pompeo said that Bensouda and another senior ICC official, Phakiso Mochochoko, would be sanctioned under this order, and that those who "materially support those individuals risk exposure to sanctions as well".

On April 4, 2021, it was reported that the United States Government had officially lifted the sanctions against Bensouda and Mochochoko, and visa restrictions against other ICC personnel.

Personal life

Bensouda is married to a Gambian-Moroccan businessman, Philip Bensouda. They have three children.

Bensouda is a practicing Muslim. Questioned in 2011, on the role of her religion in her job, she answered: "Absolutely, definitely. Islam, as you know, is a religion of peace, and it gives you this inner strength, this inner ability and a sense of justice. Together with my experience, this will help a lot.".

See also

Crimes against humanity
International Criminal Court
Rule of law
War crimes

References

External links

ICC profile 
Fatou BENSOUDA profile
Election of the Prosecutor of the International Criminal Court

|-

1961 births
Gambian women lawyers
Gambian diplomats
Government ministers of the Gambia
International Criminal Court prosecutors
International Criminal Tribunal for Rwanda prosecutors
Living people
Gambian Muslims
People from Banjul
Obafemi Awolowo University alumni
Nigerian Law School alumni
20th-century Gambian women politicians
20th-century Gambian politicians
21st-century Gambian women politicians
21st-century Gambian politicians
Women government ministers of the Gambia
Gambian officials of the United Nations
BBC 100 Women
20th-century Gambian lawyers
21st-century Gambian lawyers
Female justice ministers
20th-century women lawyers
21st-century women lawyers
International Maritime Law Institute alumni